Yi is a hentaigana, a variant kana or Japanese syllable.

History 
It is presumed that yi would have represented . Along with 𛀁 (ye) and 𛄟 (wu), the syllable yi has no officially recognized kana, as these syllables do not occur in native Japanese words; however, during the Meiji period, linguists almost unanimously agreed on the kana for yi, ye, and wu. 𛀆 (yi) and 𛄟 (wu) are thought to have never occurred as syllables in Japanese, and 𛀁 (ye) was merged with え and エ as a result of regular historical sound changes.

Characters 
In the Edo period and the Meiji period, some Japanese linguists tried to separate kana i and kana yi. The shapes of characters differed with each linguist. 𛀆 and 𛄠 were just two of many shapes.

They were phonetic symbols to fill in the blanks of the gojuon table, but Japanese people did not separate them in normal writing.

i
Traditional kana
い (Hiragana)
イ (Katakana)

yi
Traditional kana
い (Hiragana)
𛀆 (Hentaigana of い. Hiragana.𛀆)
イ (Katakana)
Constructed kana
い〻(い with dots. Hiragana.)
𛀆〻 (𛀆  with dots. Hiragana.)
イ〻(イ with dots. Katakana.)
𛄠(A part of 以. Katakana.)

These suggestions were not accepted.

Unicode 
The hiragana form of this kana is encoded into Unicode as HIRAGANA LETTER I-1, with the position of U+1B006, while the katakana is encoded as KATAKANA LETTER ARCHAIC YI, in the position U+1B120.

References

See also 
 Ye (kana)
 Wu (kana)

Specific kana